Philip Emmanuel, Prince of Piedmont (2 April 1586 – 9 February 1605) was the eldest son of Charles Emmanuel I, Duke of Savoy and Infanta Catalina Micaela of Spain.

Early years 
Philip Emmanuel's parents Charles Emmanuel I, Duke of Savoy and Infanta Catalina Micaela of Spain were married in Zaragoza in 1585. Catalina Micaela conceived quickly and gave birth to Philip Emmanuel on 2 April 1586. As heir to the Duchy of Savoy, he was styled as Prince of Piedmont. Following the birth of his brother Victor Amadeus in 1587, Philip Emmanuel was baptised with him in Turin and educated in his parents' court in his early years. Having given birth to ten children, Catalina Micaela died in childbirth in 1597.

Arrival in Spain 
After signing the Treaty of Lyon in 1601 with Henry IV of France, Charles Emmanuel I aimed to improve his relations with his brother-in-law Philip III of Spain. In order to complete the education of his eldest sons, he sent the boys to the Spanish court. Philip Emmanuel, along with his brothers Victor Amadeus and Emmanuel Philibert, arrived in Valladolid, where the court was established at the time, at the end of August 1603. In October, their uncle Philip III gave each of them their own house.

Death 
Philip Emmanuel died in Valladolid on 9 February 1605, as a result of smallpox, which was common at the time. Following his death, his brother Victor Amadeus was styled as Prince of Piedmont and later became Duke of Savoy.

Gallery

References 
https://www.britannica.com/biography/Charles-Emmanuel-I
https://blog.peramuzesi.org.tr/en/haftanin-eseri/savoyali-filippo-emanuele/

Princes of Piedmont
1586 births
1605 deaths
Burials in the Pantheon of Infantes at El Escorial
Sons of monarchs